The Battle of Sagrajas (23 October 1086), also called Zalaca or Zallaqa, was a battle between the Almoravid army led by their King Yusuf ibn Tashfin and an army led by the Castilian King Alfonso VI. The Almoravids responded to the call of Jihad by the taifas which commonly fought amongst themselves however they had united to battle the powerful Christian states to the north. The Taifas aided the Almoravids during the battle with troops, favoring the battle for the Muslim side. The battleground was later called az-Zallaqah (in English "slippery ground") because of the poor footing caused by the tremendous amount of bloodshed that day, which gave rise to its name in Arabic.

Preparations
After Alfonso VI, King of León and Castile, captured Toledo in 1085 and invaded the taifa of Zaragoza, the emirs of the smaller taifa kingdoms of Islamic Iberia found that they could not resist him without external assistance. In 1086, they invited Yusuf ibn Tashfin to fight against Alfonso VI. In that year, he replied to the call of three Andalusian leaders (Al-Mu'tamid ibn Abbad and others) and crossed the straits to Algeciras and moved to Seville. From there, accompanied by the emirs of Seville, Granada, and Taifa of Málaga, he marched to Badajoz.

Alfonso VI abandoned the siege of Zaragoza, recalled his troops from Valencia, and appealed to Sancho I of Aragon for help. Finally, he set out to meet the enemy northeast of Badajoz. The two armies met each other on 23 October 1086.

Alfonso VI of León and Castile reached the battleground with some 2,500 men, including 1,500 cavalries, of which 750 were knights, some of whom were Jewish, but found himself outnumbered. The two leaders exchanged messages before the battle. Yusuf ibn Tashfin is reputed to have offered three choices to the Castilians: convert to Islam, to pay tribute (jizyah), or battle.

Battle
The battle started on Friday at dawn with an attack from Castile. Yusuf ibn Tashfin divided his army into three divisions. The first division was led by Abbad III al-Mu'tamid, the second division was led by Yusuf ibn Tashfin, and the third division consisted of black African warriors with Talwars and long javelins. Abbad III al-Mu'tamid and his division battled with Alfonso VI alone till the afternoon, then Yusuf ibn Tashfin and his division joined the battle and encircled Alfonso VI and his troops. Alfonso's troops panicked and started to lose ground, then Yusuf ordered the third division of his army to attack and finish the battle.

Aftermath

More than half the Castilian army was lost. One source claims that only 500 cavalrymen returned to Castile, although others do not support this low figure, so it seems that most of the nobility survived. The dead included counts Rodrigo Muñoz and Vela Ovequez. King Alfonso VI sustained an injury to one leg that caused him to limp for the rest of his life.

Casualties were also heavy on the Almoravid side, especially for the hosts led by Dawud ibn Aysa, whose camp was sacked in the first hours of battle, and by the Emir of Badajoz, al-Mutawakkil ibn al-Aftas. The Sevillan Emir al-Mu'tamid had been wounded in the first clash but his personal example of valor rallied the al-Andalus forces in the difficult moments of the initial Castilian charge led by Alvar Fañez. Those killed included a very popular imam from Córdoba, Abu-l-Abbas Ahmad ibn Rumayla, and members of Ibn Khaldun's family are also known to have been killed in the battle.

The battle was a decisive victory for the Almoravids but their losses meant that it was not possible to follow it up although Yusuf had to return prematurely to Africa due to the death of his heir. Castile suffered almost no loss of territory and was able to retain the city of Toledo, occupied the previous year. However, the Christian advance was halted for several generations while both sides regrouped.

Notes

References
 Dupuy, R. Ernest and Trevor N. Dupuy, The Harper Encyclopedia of Military History, HarperCollins Publishers, 1993.
 France, John, Western Warfare in the Age of the Crusades, 1000–1300 (Ithaca: Cornell University Press, 1999), 
 Heath, I. (1989). Armies of Feudal Europe 1066–1300 (2nd ed.). Wargames Research Group.
 Kennedy, H. (1996). Muslim Spain and Portugal: A political history of al-Andalus. London: Longman.
 Lewis, David Levering, God's Crucible: Islam and the Making of Europe, 570 to 1215 (New York: W & W Norton Inc, 2008), .
 Livermore, H. V. (1966) A New History of Portugal. Cambridge University Press.
 Nicolle, D. (1988) El Cid and the Reconquista 1050–1492 (Men-at-Arms 200). Osprey.
 Smith, C. (1989–92) Christians and Moors in Spain, Aris & Phillips

Sagrajas
Sagrajas
Sagrajas
Sagrajas
Sagrajas
11th century in the Kingdom of León
Sagrajas
1086 in Europe
Sagrajas
11th century in Al-Andalus